"Helicopter" is a song by English rock band Bloc Party that was originally released as a stand-alone single in the UK in October 2004 and would later feature on the Little Thoughts EP, and would then be released two years later as a single from their debut album, Silent Alarm in the US. The song was received with much acclaim, reaching number 26 on the UK Singles Chart on its first release, but failing to chart in the US. Various remixes have been recorded.

The song has also been featured on the video games Guitar Hero III: Legends of Rock, Guitar Hero: On Tour, FIFA 06, FIFA 23, Project Gotham Racing 3, Burnout Revenge, Burnout Legends, Colin McRae Dirt 2, and Marc Eckō's Getting Up: Contents Under Pressure. Most of these games feature the clean version of the song that omits the word "bastard" and replaces it with "innocent". 

The song was also featured in the films Yes Man, Charlie St. Cloud and Grandma's Boy and in the Malcolm in the Middle episode "Morp". A remix of the song was featured in the film Reverb.

Composition
"Helicopter" is an indie rock and garage rock song, written by all band members prior to their debut studio album, Silent Alarm. Composed in B minor, it was written in common time and has a quick tempo of 171 beats per minute. The main riff was adapted from "Set The House Ablaze", a song by The Jam featured on the 1980 album Sound Affects.

Music video
The official video is displayed in black and white and shows the band playing in an old, empty house, intercut with surreal imagery. It has received the most views of any of Bloc Party's songs on YouTube, gaining over 30 million views.

Track listing
7" Wichita / WEBB070S (UK)
 "Helicopter"
 "Skeleton"

CD Wichita / WEBB070SCD (UK)
 "Helicopter"
 "Always New Depths"
 "Tulips" (Minotaur Shock mix)

US CD
 "Helicopter" (Diplo remix)
 "Helicopter" (Weird Science remix featuring Peaches)
 "Helicopter" (Whitey remix)
 "Helicopter" (Original version)

US 12" vinyl
 "Helicopter" (Diplo remix)
 "Helicopter" (Weird Science remix featuring Peaches)

Charts

Certifications

References

2006 singles
Bloc Party songs
2004 songs
Song recordings produced by Paul Epworth
Wichita Recordings singles
Songs written by Kele Okereke
Songs written by Gordon Moakes
Songs written by Russell Lissack
Songs written by Matt Tong